Archeological Site No. LA 54049 is a prehistoric archaeological site in Hidalgo County, New Mexico. While the purpose of the lines is uncertain, they may have demarcated a court for some sort of ball game. The site also includes a large lithic scatter and numerous ceramic fragments.

The site was added to the National Register of Historic Places on January 23, 1993.

See also

National Register of Historic Places listings in Hidalgo County, New Mexico

References

Archaeological sites on the National Register of Historic Places in New Mexico
Hidalgo County, New Mexico
National Register of Historic Places in Hidalgo County, New Mexico